Juraev, Jurayev, Djuraev, Djurayev, Joʻrayev, Dzhurayev or Dzhuraev (Uzbek: Жўраев) is a Central Asian masculine surname, its feminine counterpart is Juraeva, Jurayeva, Djuraeva, Djurayeva, Joʻrayeva, Dzhurayeva or Dzhuraeva. The surname may refer to the following notable people:

Abduhamid Juraev (1932–2005), Tajik mathematician
Akbar Djuraev (born 1999), Uzbekistani weightlifter
Dilshod Juraev (born 1992), Uzbekistani football player
Sakhob Juraev (born 1987), Uzbekistani football player
Sherali Juraev (born 1986), Uzbekistani judoka
Sherali Joʻrayev, Uzbek singer, songwriter, poet, and actor
Temur Juraev (born 1984), Uzbekistani football goalkeeper 
Zebo Juraeva, Uzbekistani football forward
Zinura Djuraeva (born 1985), Uzbekistani judoka

Uzbek-language surnames